The Treasurer (or often also translated as Chancellor) in Ancient Egypt is the modern translation of the title imi-r ḫtmt (word by word: Overseer of the Seal or Overseer of sealed things). The office is known since the end of the Old Kingdom, where people with this title appear sporadically in the organization of private estates.

In the Middle Kingdom, the office became one of the most important ones at the royal court. At the end of the 18th Dynasty, the title lost its importance, although the famous Bay had this office. In the later New Kingdom the function of a treasurer was overtaken by the overseer of the treasury.

The treasurer was responsible for products coming to the royal palace. They were the main economic administrator of the royal belongings.

Middle Kingdom title holders 

Bebi, was later appointed vizier, under Mentuhotep II
Kheti, under Mentuhotep II
Meketre, under Mentuhotep II and after 
Ipi, under Amenemhet I
Rehuerdjersen, under Amenemhet I or later
Sobekhotep, under Senusret I, year 22
Mentuhotep, under Senusret I
Merykau, under Amenemhat II
Siese, was later appointed vizier, under Amenemhat II
Senankh, under Senusret III
Sobekemhat under Senusret III
Iykhernofret, under Senusret III
Senusretankh, under Amenemhat III 
Senebsumai, Thirteenth Dynasty
Senebi, Thirteenth Dynasty
Amenhotep, Thirteenth Dynasty

New Kingdom title holders 

Neferperet, under  Ahmose I
Ahmose Pen-Nekhebet, under  Ahmose I to Hatshepsut
Nehsi, under Hatshepsut
Tay, under Hatshepsut
Sennefer, under Thutmose III
Min, under Thutmose III
Sobekhotep, under Thutmose IV
Meryre, under Amenhotep III
Ptahmose, under Amenhotep III, after year 30
Bay, under Seti II

Late Period 
Udjahorresnet, under Cambyses II and Darius I

References

Literature 
Stephen Quirke: Titles and bureaux of Egypt 1850-1700 BC, London 2004 p. 48-49 

Ancient Egyptian titles
 
Historical management occupations